Janet A. Hoag (born September 19, 1948) is an American film and television actress. Her first major feature film role was in Brian Yuzna's slasher film The Dentist (1996). She later had minor supporting roles in the films Wild (2014) and Steven Spielberg's The Fabelmans (2022).

Hoag has appeared as a guest star in numerous television series, including recurring roles on 8 Simple Rules (2004), Scream Queens (2015), and Big Shot (2021).

Early life
Hoag was born September 19, 1948 in Portland, Oregon. She graduated from Holy Child Academy in Portland and later attended Oregon State University, graduating with a degree in business.

She later worked in managerial positions for the Portland-based department store Meier and Frank before taking a sales management position in Southern California. Hoag was inspired to act after attending theater productions in Los Angeles. She abandoned her sales career and enrolled at the Lee Strasberg Institute to study acting.

Career 
Since the beginning of the 1990s, Hoag has appeared in several television series, including Murder, She Wrote, Step by Step, Married... with Children, Melrose Place, Murphy Brown, Providence, Judging Amy, The Norm Show, Buffy the Vampire Slayer, 8 Simple Rules, Sunset Beach, Desperate Housewives, Gilmore Girls, Boston Legal, Mad Men, Coop & Cami Ask the World and others, although always playing minor characters. She guest starred on Glee in the episode "I Kissed a Girl", and in The Big Bang Theory in the season 6 episode "The Re-Entry Minimization". Hoag had a recurring character as Agatha Bean on the first season of Scream Queens.
 
She has also appeared in some feature films, including The Dentist (1996), Progeny (1998), Raising Flagg, and Wild (2014). Subsequent film roles include in Karyn Kusama's thriller Destroyer (2018). In 2022, she had a minor supporting role in Steven Spielberg's The Fabelmans.

Filmography

Film

Television

References

External links

Jan Hoag Biography of films

1948 births
American film actresses
American television actresses
Living people
Actresses from Portland, Oregon
Lee Strasberg Theatre and Film Institute alumni
Oregon State University alumni
20th-century American actresses
21st-century American actresses